3400 may refer to:

In general
 A.D. 3400, a year in the 4th millennium CE
 3400 BC, a year in the 4th millennium BCE
 3400, a number in the 3000 (number) range

Products
 IBM 3400 series 
 Nord 3400 aircraft
 NS 3400 steam locomotives
 NS Class 3400 diesel multiple unit trains
 PowerBook 3400c laptop
 Queensland Railways 3400 class electric locomotives

Other uses
 3400 Aotearoa, an asteroid in the Asteroid Belt, the 3400th asteroid registered
 Hawaii Route 3400, a state highway
 3400 (District of Librazhd), one of the postal codes in Albania

See also

 A3400 road in the UK